Antoine [de] Ratabon (1617 – 12 March 1670) was a French aristocrat, who was an arts and architecture administrator during the reign of Louis XIV. He was Director of the Académie de Peinture et de Sculpture from 1655 to 1670 and Surintendant des Bâtiments (Superintendent of Buildings) from 1656 to 1664.

Early life and career
Ratabon was born in Montpellier, the son of Jean de Ratabon, an equerry, and Catherine Pache from Servien, near Mende. He became Maître d'Hôtel Ordinaire of King Louis XIV, Trésorier Général de France at Montpellier, and Intendant des Gabelles of Languedoc.

Bâtiments du Roi
In Paris he became First Assistant to François Sublet de Noyers, who was the Surintendant des Bâtiments under Cardinal Richelieu, and continued in this role under Étienne Le Camus, who succeeded Sublet de Noyers as Surintendant after the latter's dismissal under Cardinal Mazarin in 1643. Ratabon succeeded Le Camus in 1656. Ratabon relinquished the post to Jean-Baptiste Colbert on 1 January 1664.

In his role as Surintendant des Bâtiments, Ratabon ordered the demolition of the Hôtel du Petit-Bourbon in October 1660 to make way for the eastward expansion of the Louvre and construction of the Louvre Colonnade. The order resulted in the eviction without warning of the troupe of Molière from the theatre of the Petit Bourbon and their transfer to the disused and run-down theatre of the Palais-Royal.

Personal life
By a contract of 1 March 1647, Ratabon married Marie Sanguin, daughter of Nicolas Sanguin, an equerry and sieur de Pierrelaye. The eight-year-old Louis XIV, his mother Anne d'Autriche, and Cardinal Mazarin were all present and signed the contract. The couple had several children of which three survived into adulthood:
 Louis de Ratabon (died September 1693), seigneur de Trememont, Gentleman of the Chambre du Roi, Governor of Fécamp, and Special Envoy for the King to Liège, Venice and other foreign places. 
 Marie-Marguerite de Ratabon (1652–1736), married Louis Verjus, Seigneur et Comte de Crécy, in 1676.
 Martin de Ratabon (1654–1728), doctor at the Sorbonne, Bishop of Ypres

In 1664 Ratabon constructed a house, the Hôtel de Ratabon, to the designs of the architect Pierre Le Muet on a site on the western border of the garden of the Palais-Royal, now 10 rue de Richelieu in the 1st arrondissement of Paris. He died in this house in 1670. It was destroyed in 1873.

Notes

Bibliography
 Bajou, Thierry (1998). La peinture à Versailles : XVIIe siècle. [English edition: Paintings at Versailles: XVIIth Century, translated by Elizabeth Wiles-Portier, p. 76.] Paris: Réunion des musées nationaux.  .  (English edition).
 Ballon, Hilary (1999). Louis Le Vau: Mazarin's Collège, Colbert's Revenge. Princeton University Press. .
 Cojannot, Alexandre (2003). "Mazarin et le « Grand Dessein » du Louvre: Projets et réalisations de 1652 à 1664.", in Bibliothèque de l'École des Chartes. . .
 Gady, Alexandre (2008). Les Hôtels particuliers de Paris du Moyen Âge à la Belle Époque. Paris: Parigramme. .
 Gordan, Alden R. (1996). "Maison du Roi, II. Bâtiments du Roi", vol. 20, pp. 132–137, in The Dictionary of Art, 34 volumes, edited by Jane Turner. New York: Grove. .
 Hardouin, Christophe (1994). "La Collection de portraits de l'Académie royale de Peinture et de Sculpture: Peintures entrées sous le règne de Louis XIV (1648–1715", Mémoire de D.E.A., Université de Paris IV, 1994, pp. 164–166.
 Jal, Auguste (1872). "Ratabon (Antoine de)", p. 1042, in Dictionnaire critique de biographie et d'histoire, 2nd edition. Paris: Henri Plon.
 Laprade, Albert (1955). "Portraits des premiers architectes de Versailles", Revue des Arts, March 1955, pp. 21–24. 
 Laprade, Albert (1960). François d'Orbay: Architecte de Louis XIV. Paris: Éditions Vincent, Fréal. .
 Michel, Christian (2018). The Académie Royale de Peinture et de Sculpture: The Birth of the French School, 1648–1793, translated from French by Chris Miller. Los Angeles: Getty Research Institute. .
 Vitu, Auguste-Charles-Joseph (1880). La Maison mortuaire de Molière d'apres des Documents inédits, avec Plans et Dessins. Paris: Alphonse Lemerre. Copy at HathiTrust. Copy at Gallica.
 Williams, Hannah (2015). Académie Royale: A History in Portraits. Farnham, Surrey: Ashgate. .

1617 births
1670 deaths
People from Montpellier
Académie royale de peinture et de sculpture
Heads of the Bâtiments du Roi